Astan Quds Razavi is a bonyad based at Mashhad, Iran.  It is the administrative organization which manages the Imam Reza shrine and various institutions which belong to the organization.

The administrative apparatus of Astan Quds Razavi is considered the longest-lasting organization since the martyrdom of Imam Reza about 1200 years ago. The main resource of the institution is endowments. The Astan Quds Razavi is a major player in the economy of the city of Mashhad. The organization by order of Ruhollah Khomeini was tax exempt for 35 years until 2019.

History

Before Safavids era

From Safavids era until Islamic revolution

Current situation
Since the revolution, the Astan-e-Qods the bonyad has grown from a "modest concern" into a conglomerate employing 19,000 people  and running "auto plants, agricultural businesses, and many other enterprises"  

The land occupied by the shrine has grown fourfold since 1979, according to the head of the foundation's international relations department.  The foundation owns most of the real estate in Mashhad and rents out shop space to bazaars and hoteliers. 

According to journalist Christopher de Bellaigue, "when asked to identify the most important man in the city, Mashhadis do not name the mayor but rather" the head of Astan-e-Qods.

Ayatollah Abbas Vaez-Tabasi had been the head of Astan-e-Qods from the revolution until his death in 2016.
Ebrahim Raisi succeeded him in March 2016 and held office until April 2019. Finally, the supreme leader of Iran, Seyyed Ali Khamenei appointed Ahmad Marvi as the new chief of this Bonyad instead of Ebrahim Raisi; and Raisi became the Chief Justice of Iran.

Institutes

Publications
 Behnashr Publishing
Quds Daily
 Za'ir Magazine
 Haram Magazine
 Printing and Publication Organization

Cultural and educational institute
 Imam Reza (A.S.) University
 Islamic Research Foundation
 Youth Counseling Services and Social Research Institute
 Razavi Cultural Foundation
 Artistic Creativity and Audio-Visual Media Institution
 Astan Quds Razavi Central Museum
 Malek Library and National Museum 
 The Dar-ul-Quran of the Astan Quds Razavi
 The Central Museum of Astan Quds Razavi
 Supreme Cultural Council
 Central Library of Astan Quds Razavi
 Razavi University of Islamic Sciences
 Islamic Propagation and Relations Directorate
 International Relations Office
 On Duty Education Centre for the Employees of the Astan Quds Razavi

Economic institutes
 Economic Organization of Astan Quds Razavi
 Behnashr Company
 Carpet Company
 Insurance Company
 Canning and Cold-Storage Company
 Kenebist Farm
 Housing and Construction Company
 Flour Company
 Samen Pharmaceutical Company
 Bread Manufacturing Industry
 Wood Industry
 Dairy Products Company
 Behnashr Publishing Company
 Orchards Organization
 The Agricultural Units of the Astan Quds Razavi
 The Industrial and Mines, Development and Services Units of the Astan Quds Razavi
 Razavi Brokerage Company
 Razavi Transport Company

Health care institutes
 Physical Training Organization of the Astan Quds Razavi
 Medical Services
 Pharmacy Institute
 Razavi Super-Specialization Hospital

Construction
 Expanding the Sacred Places of Astan Quds Razavi

Social institute
 Social Welfare Affairs related to the pilgrims of the Holy Shrine of Imam Reza(A.S.)
 Welfare Institutions and Services of the Astan Quds Razavi
 Astan Quds Razavi Sports Complex, Mashhad, Iran

Other related institutes
 International Congress on Imam Reza (A.S.)
 Ayatollah Abbas Vaez Tabasi, Reverend Custodian of Astan Quds Razavi

See also
 Bonyad
 Imam Reza
 Imam Reza shrine
 Goharshad Mosque
 Economy of Iran

Footnotes

External links
 Astan Quds Razavi
 Astan Quds Razavi on Instagram

Mashhad
Shia organizations
Charities based in Iran
Organizations established in 1795
Foundations based in Iran
Organisations under the direct control of the Supreme Leader of Iran
Iranian entities subject to the U.S. Department of the Treasury sanctions
Imam Reza shrine
Cultural organisations based in Iran
Educational organisations based in Iran
Business organisations based in Iran
Book publishing companies of Iran